Mangelia thepalea is a species of sea snail, a marine gastropod mollusk in the family Mangeliidae.

This is a taxon inquirendum.

Description
The length of this shell attains 5.5 mm, its diameter 2 mm.

(Original description) This is a very delicate, beautiful little shell. The white shell is pyramidally spindle-shaped. It contains seven whorls, the two in the protoconch being glassy and apical. The subsequent 
are ventricose and impressed at the sutures. The longitudinal ribs are nodulous, shining, and very regular.  One spiral sulcation crosses each rib in the middle.  The interstices between are beautifully longitudinally striolate. At the sutures, and in the middle of the body whorl (in some specimens also on the upper whorls), there is a very pale ochraceous banding, the nodules of the ribs still retaining their white lustre. In other specimens the first three or four whorls remain quite colourless. The aperture is oblong. The sinus is sutural, obliquely extending over the outer lip, which is much incrassate within with seven prominent denticles, these being provided with three also of lesser size.

Distribution
This marine species occurs off the Loyalty Islands .

References

External links
  Tucker, J.K. 2004 Catalog of recent and fossil turrids (Mollusca: Gastropoda). Zootaxa 682:1–1295.

thepalea
Gastropods described in 1896